Robert Frank "Bob" List (born September 1, 1936) is an American attorney and politician. A member of the Republican Party, he served as the 24th Governor of Nevada from 1979 to 1983, as Nevada Attorney General from 1971 to 1979, and as Carson City District Attorney from 1967 to 1971. Currently List practices law in Las Vegas with the law firm Kolesar & Leatham, Chtd. He was the last Governor to serve from outside Clark County until Jim Gibbons' election. After his term ended, he became a supporter of the Yucca Mountain nuclear waste repository. List was defeated for re-election in 1982 by Nevada Attorney General Richard Bryan.

Education
List received his J.D. and LL.D. degrees from the University of California, Hastings College of the Law in 1962. He is licensed with the State Bar of Nevada, District of Columbia Bar, and U.S. Supreme Court. He is a member of the American Bar Association, Nevada State Bar Association, Society of Attorneys General Emeritus and Past Governors' Association.

Current practice

On December 1, 2010, List joined Kolesar & Leatham, Chtd., a Las Vegas business law firm, as a senior partner. He is also the chief executive officer of The Robert List Company, a lobbying firm.

List served as Carson City, Nevada District Attorney from 1966 to 1970 and Attorney General of Nevada from 1970 to 1978. In 1978, he was elected Governor, serving in that capacity until 1983. He served as Chairman of both the Western Governors Association and the Conference of Western Attorneys General.

Personal life
He is married to Mary Ann (Polly) Minor List and they have two children, Robert and Elizabeth. He also has three adult children; Suzanne, Hank, and Michelle.

References

|-

1936 births
Living people
District attorneys in Nevada
Republican Party governors of Nevada
Nevada Attorneys General
Politicians from Carson City, Nevada
People from Exeter, California
Politicians from Las Vegas
People from Visalia, California
University of California, Hastings College of the Law alumni